William Davis may refer to:

Academia
 William C. Davis (historian) (born 1946), American historian and university professor
 William H. Davis (educator) (1848–1938), American educator and school administrator 
 William Hatcher Davis (1939–2017), professor of philosophy, Auburn University
 William Stearns Davis (1877–1930), American educator, historian, and writer
 William Watson Davis (1884–1960), professor and author

Arts and entertainment

Film, television, and theater
 William B. Davis (born 1938), actor, professor, and waterskier
 Will S. Davis (1882–1920), American film director
 Wee Willie Davis (1906–1981), American film actor
 Bill C. Davis (1952–2021), American playwright and actor
 Robert Hartford-Davis (1923–1977), born William Henry Davis, British producer, director and writer

Music
 Bill Davis (musician), American guitarist, vocalist, and songwriter
 Wild Bill Davis (1918–1995), American jazz musician
 William "Bill" Davis, baritone, founding member of the 1950s R&B group The Crows
 Will Davis (musician) (born 1926), jazz pianist

Other media
 William Davis (journalist) (1933–2019), economics editor, BBC presenter, editor of Punch, 1969–1977
 William Davis (artist) (1812–1873), Irish Pre-Raphaelite artist
 William Davis (photographer), American photographer
 William Moore Davis (1829–1920), American painter
 William Virgil Davis (born 1940), American poet
 Bill Davis (artist) (born 1949), American illustrator, animation director and designer, graphic designer, and painter

Military
 William A. Davis Jr. (1927–2017), engineer for the United States Army
 William Church Davis (1866–1958), U.S. Army general
 William G. M. Davis (1812–1898), Confederate States Army general 
 William V. Davis (1902–1981), United States Navy admiral
 William Davis (Royal Navy officer) (1901–1987), British admiral

Politics
 Bill Davis (1929–2021), Canadian politician, premier of Ontario
 Will Davis (politician) (born 1968), Illinois State Representative for the 30th district
 William C. Davis (American politician) (1867–1934), 11th lieutenant governor of Alabama
 William C. Davis (Canadian politician) (born 1939), Canadian politician
 William E. Davis (born 1929), former university president, Democratic politician and football coach
 William Hammatt Davis (1879–1964), American politician
 William Henry Davis (1872–1951), appointed assistant to the Secretary of War, 1917
 William H. Davis (sheriff), Pittsburgh City Council member, 1952–1954; Sheriff of Allegheny County, 1954–1970
 William H. Davis (Pennsylvania state representative), served 1854
 William H. Davis (Pennsylvania state senator) (1900–1955), served 1955 
 William Lovel Davis (1844–1932), Australian politician
 William Morris Davis (congressman) (1815–1891), U.S. Representative from Pennsylvania
 William Walter Davis (1840–1923), Australian politician
 William Z. Davis (1839–1923), Republican politician in the U.S. State of Ohio and Ohio Supreme Court Judge
 William Howe Davis (1904–1982), American politician, mayor of Orange, New Jersey

Science
 William Davis (cardiologist) (born 1957), American cardiologist and author of Wheat Belly
 William C. Davis Jr. (1921–2010), American ballistics engineer and writer
 William Conan Davis (born 1926), African-American scientist
 William Morris Davis (1850–1934), American geographer, geologist and meteorologist
 William T. Davis (1862–1945), naturalist, entomologist and historian

Sports

American football
 William C. Davis (American football) (1938–2020), American football coach
 Willie Davis (defensive end) (1934–2020), American football defensive end
 Willie Davis (wide receiver) (born 1967), American football wide receiver
 Will Davis (linebacker) (born 1986), American football defensive end
 Will Davis (cornerback) (born 1990), American football cornerback
 Bill Davis (coach) (1941–2002), American football coach

Baseball
 William Davis (baseball), Negro league baseball player
 Willie Davis (baseball) (1940–2010), center fielder in Major League Baseball
 Will Davis (baseball) (born 1984), American college baseball coach
 Bill Davis (baseball) (born 1942), baseball player
 Babe Davis (William L. Davis, fl.1937–1939), American baseball player

Basketball
 Will Davis (basketball) (born 1992), American basketball
 Willie Davis (basketball) (born 1945), basketball player
 Bill Davis (basketball) (1921–1975), basketball player

Rugby union
 Will Davis (rugby union) (born 1990), English rugby union player
 Bill Davis (rugby union) (born 1942), New Zealand rugby union and softball player
 Wendy Davis (rugby union)  (William Edward Norman Davis, 1913–2002), international rugby union player for Wales

Other sports
 Bill Davis (darts player) (born 1959), American darts player
 Bill Davis (NASCAR owner), motorsports car owner
 J. William Davis, father of the National Letter of Intent for college athletics
 William Davis (cricketer, born 1880) (1880–1959), who played for Surrey, London County and the South of England from 1903 to 1911
 Will Davis (cricketer) (born 1996), English cricketer
 Will Davis (cyclist) (1877–?), French Olympic cyclist
 William Davis (golfer) (died 1902), Scottish golfer
 Bill Davis (ice hockey) (born 1954), Canadian ice hockey player

Other people
 William Davis (miner) (1887–1925), miner killed during strike protest leading to Davis Day
 William Heath Davis (1822–1909), early settler of San Diego, California, USA
 William John Davis (1848–1934), British trade unionist
 William Rhodes Davis (1889–1941), American oil man and Nazi collaborator
 William Davis (bishop) (1908–1987), Anglican bishop and archbishop in Canada
 William Davis (judge) (born 1954), judge of the High Court of England and Wales
 William Davis (priest), English priest
 William George Davis, American serial killer and former nurse

See also
 Billy Newton-Davis (born 1951), Canadian R&B, jazz and gospel singer-songwriter
 Billy Davis (disambiguation)
 William Davies (disambiguation)